Windy Point may refer to:

United States
Windy Point, Arizona
Windy Point, Sierra Nevada, California
Windy Point, Morgan Territory, California
Windy Point, Los Gatos, California
Windy Point, El Paso County, Colorado
Windy Point, Conejos County, Colorado
Windy Point, Oregon
Windy Point, Puget Sound, Washington

Other places
 Windy Point, Adelaide, Australia
 Windy Point, Alberta, Canada
 Windy Point, Te Kuha, South Island, New Zealand

See also
 Windy Point/Windy Flats, a wind farm in Goldendale, Washington